Christian Bunse (born 6 January 1995) is a German professional darts player who plays in Professional Darts Corporation (PDC) events.

Career
He made his PDC European Tour debut in the 2017 European Darts Open, but was defeated 6–4 by Jerry Hendriks. He then qualified for the 2018 European Darts Grand Prix, again losing in the first round, this time 6–2 to Jamie Lewis.

Bunse won a two-year PDC tour card on day 3 of the 2019 PDC European Q-School, beating Pavel Jirkal 5–2 in the final, he failed to make the top 64 at the end of 2020 partly due to restricted play during the Covid-19 pandemic, he returned to EU Q-School winning his Last 128 game against Patrick Bulen 6-4, but lost in the last 64 against Kevin Blumme 5-6.

Bunse contested the first 3 event on the EU PDC Challenge Tour 2021 but has not attended any PDC events since.

References

External links

1995 births
Living people
German darts players
Professional Darts Corporation former tour card holders
Sportspeople from Paderborn